St. Peter's or similar terms may mean:

Places

Australia 
St Peters, New South Wales, a suburb of Sydney
St Peters, South Australia

Canada 
St. Peter's, Nova Scotia
St. Peters Canal, Cape Breton Island

Channel Islands 
St Peter's, Guernsey

Ireland 
St. Peters, County Roscommon, a civil parish in County Roscommon

Malta 
St. Peters, a hamlet in Żabbar, Malta.

Switzerland 
St. Peter's Island, in Lake Biel

United Kingdom 
St Peters, Thanet, Kent, England
St Peter's (Wolverhampton ward), a ward of Wolverhampton City Council, West Midlands, England
St Peter the Great, Worcester, also called St Peter's, suburb in Worcester, England

United States 
St. Peters, Missouri, a city
Saint Peter's Village, Chester County, Pennsylvania

Religious institutions
St. Peter's Basilica, Vatican City, within Rome, Italy
Old St. Peter's Basilica, the building that once stood on the spot where the Basilica of Saint Peter stands today in Rome
St. Peter's Abbey (disambiguation), various
St. Peter's Cathedral (disambiguation), various
St. Peter's Church (disambiguation), various

Educational institutions
St Peter's College (disambiguation)
St Peter's School (disambiguation)
Saint Peter's University, a Jesuit university in Jersey City, New Jersey
St Peters Lutheran College, a private high school in Brisbane, Queensland, Australia
St Peter's Academy, a secondary school in Stoke-on-Trent, Staffordshire, England
St Peter's Catholic College, South Bank, a secondary school in South Bank, North Yorkshire, England
St Peter's Collegiate Girls' School, a private school in Adelaide, South Australia
St Peter's College, Auckland, a boys' secondary school in Auckland, New Zealand
St Peter's, Sunderland, a university campus in England

People
Crispian St. Peters (1939–2010), British singer, best known for his hit single "The Pied Piper"

Railway stations
 St. Peters railway station, Newcastle upon Tyne, closed
 St Peter's Metro station, Newcastle upon Tyne

Others
St. Peter's Brewery, a brewery in Suffolk, England
St. Peter's College Boat Club, Oxford
St. Peter's keys, a three-legged Lewis, used to lift large stones
Saint Peter's Peacocks, athletic teams of Saint Peter's University
St. Peters RFC, rugby union team from the town of Roath, Cardiff, South Wales, UK
Saint Peter's University Hospital, New Brunswick, New Jersey, United States
St. Peter's fish, a name given to certain species of tilapia

See also
St. Peter's Church (disambiguation)
St. Peter (disambiguation)